A tables, ladders, and chairs match, often abbreviated as TLC, is a type of professional wrestling match that originated within the World Wrestling Federation (WWF, now WWE).

The TLC match is a variation of a ladder match, which is modified to co-emphasize two other weapons: tables and chairs. The goal is to acquire the item (usually championship belts) which starts the match suspended above the ring. A TLC match can be seen as a more complicated ladder match, where tables and chairs, along with ladders, can also be used as legal foreign objects.

TLC matches that could also exist as a variation of a hardcore match, where tables, ladders, and chairs can also be used as legal foreign objects, but the only way to win this variation of the TLC match is by pinfall or submission.

Origin 
The match originates around the tag teams of The Dudley Boyz, The Hardy Boyz, and Edge and Christian. The particular weapons of tables, ladders and chairs were seen as unique to each team's style. The Hardys were seen as high-flying daredevils with a penchant for using ladders, the Dudley Boyz would often use tables as weapons, and Edge and Christian became notable for using steel chairs in tandem against opponents.

WWF/WWE 
World Wrestling Federation created and adapted the matches to make it known today as a TLC match. The idea of the TLC match in WWF had its origins in a tag team ladder match for the managerial services of Terri Runnels between Edge and Christian and The Hardy Boyz (Matt Hardy and Jeff Hardy), at No Mercy 1999 during the Attitude Era, with the audience giving all four wrestlers a standing ovation at the end of the match. The move catapulted both tag teams to the top of the tag team world. The following months had The Hardy Boyz face The Dudley Boyz, (Bubba Ray Dudley and D-Von Dudley) at the Royal Rumble 2000, in a violent and chaotic tag-team Tables match, where ladders and chairs were used as much as tables- had similar success.

The three teams would be known for their three respective foreign objects, as well as the hardcore wrestling styles associated therein: the Dudley Boyz often Powerbombed or Death Dropped their opponents through tables during or after matches; the Hardy Boyz, in singles matches, challenged main-event singles wrestlers (such as The Undertaker) in ladder matches, considered at that time to be the "signature match" of the team (as they were both high-flyers, they specialized with high spots, and doing them off the top of ladders amplified their effectiveness), while Edge and Christian developed the "con-chair-to", which involved the two hitting an opponent's head simultaneously, on opposite sides, with chairs. Eventually, the three teams were brought together in a triangle ladder match at WrestleMania 2000, in what was the forerunner of the TLC in terms of the spots involved (tables were involved in some of the major spots, even though it was technically a ladder match).

The first official TLC match was contested between these three teams using the weapons that they had made famous at SummerSlam 2000. These matches frequently involved members of these three teams, and are largely remembered for the dangerous stunts, object destruction, chaotic pace, injuries and length. 

The second TLC match happened at WrestleMania X-Seven. Lita hit Spike Dudley with a chair shot to the head, Christian and D-Von Dudley hung 20 feet in the air, Bubba Ray Dudley and Matt Hardy jumped off a toppling ladder and crashed through 4 stacked tables on ringside, and Edge speared a hanging Jeff Hardy by jumping off a 20-ft ladder. After TLC I and II, every subsequent TLC match was toned down to reduce the high risks and dangers they posed. 

TLC III on the May 24, 2001 episode of SmackDown! saw the tag team of Chris Jericho and Chris Benoit defend their tag team championship against the usual other three tag teams.

In the fourth TLC match on the October 7, 2002 episode of Raw, four tag teams had drawn, as a result of "Raw roulette" (where the match type of every match of the card was determined by spinning a wheel), a TLC match. The match saw defending champions Kane and The Hurricane putting their World Tag Team titles up against the teams of Christian and Chris Jericho, Bubba Ray Dudley and Spike Dudley, and Jeff Hardy and Rob Van Dam. Being the veterans that they were to the match itself, general manager Eric Bischoff allowed Hardy, Christian and Dudley to choose their own partners, as their former partners Matt Hardy, Edge, and D-Von Dudley were unavailable as SmackDown! wrestlers. Prior to the match, The Hurricane was taken out backstage causing Kane to defend the titles by himself.

On the January 16, 2006 episode of Raw, WWE held its fifth TLC match, the first in over three years. Edge, who was in his fourth TLC match successfully defended his WWE Championship against Ric Flair, who was in his first ever Ladder match of any kind. It was the first TLC match to be held in singles competition and the first to have the WWE Championship on the line. TLC VI at Unforgiven 2006 saw John Cena winning the WWE Championship from Edge. TLC VII was held at One Night Stand 2008 saw Edge winning the vacant World Heavyweight Championship, defeating The Undertaker and (kayfabe) banishing him from WWE. TLC VIII  at SummerSlam 2009 saw CM Punk winning the World Heavyweight Championship from TLC veteran Jeff Hardy. This marked the first time Jeff Hardy had participated in a singles TLC match.

In December 2009, WWE introduced TLC: Tables, Ladders & Chairs as a new pay-per-view event, which included a tables match, a ladder match, a match in which chairs were legal as weapons and, as the main event, a TLC match. TLC IX in the 2009 event pitted Chris Jericho and The Big Show against D-Generation X (Triple H and Shawn Michaels) for the Unified WWE Tag Team Championship. This was the first TLC match to not include any member from the three original teams.

A year later, at TLC 2010, the TLC match, for the first time, was a fatal four-way. The match pitted Edge, Kane, Rey Mysterio and Alberto Del Rio against each other for the World Heavyweight Championship. In the end, Edge won the title. This was also Edge's seventh and last TLC match because of his retirement in early April the following year.

The next year at TLC 2011, CM Punk defended his WWE Championship in a first-ever triple threat TLC match against Alberto Del Rio and The Miz.  Punk retained the championship, and this marked the second time that all three competitors had competed in a TLC match.

At TLC 2012, The Shield (Dean Ambrose, Seth Rollins, and Roman Reigns) fought Ryback and Team Hell No (Kane and Daniel Bryan). This was the first TLC match to contain teams of three and was the first TLC match for everyone involved except Kane. It was the first TLC match decided by pinfall or submission and the first in which all the weapons would have to be retrieved from under the ring.

At TLC 2013, WWE Champion Randy Orton defeated World Heavyweight Champion John Cena in a TLC match for both the WWE and World Heavyweight titles. Orton won to become the first WWE World Heavyweight Champion.

At Extreme Rules (2014), a "WeeLC match" was contested between El Torito and Hornswoggle, the first TLC match to involve midget wrestlers and the second to be decided by pinfall or submission. The tables, ladders and chairs that the midget wrestlers used in this match were far smaller than the normal sized tables, ladders and chairs.

At TLC 2014 Bray Wyatt defeated Dean Ambrose in the 17th TLC Match. This was also the third TLC match in which victory would be achieved by pinfall or submission. 

At TLC 2015, Sheamus retained the WWE World Heavyweight Championship against Roman Reigns in the 18th TLC Match.

At TLC 2016, AJ Styles retained the WWE World Championship against Dean Ambrose in the 19th TLC Match.

TLC 2017 marked the 20th TLC Match. Originally scheduled to feature the reunited Shield (Dean Ambrose, Seth Rollins, and Roman Reigns) against the team of The Miz, Braun Strowman, Kane and Cesaro and Sheamus, Reigns was removed from the match due to a legitimate illness. Kurt Angle replaced Reigns, making the match Angle's first in WWE since 2006. This was the first handicap TLC Match and the fourth decided by pinfall or submission.

On the December 10, 2018 episode of Raw Seth Rollins defended the Intercontinental Championship in a TLC match against Baron Corbin. A few days later, TLC 2018 marked the first women's TLC Match, as Becky Lynch lost the WWE SmackDown Women's Championship to Asuka in a match also involving Charlotte Flair. Also, Braun Strowman defeated Baron Corbin in a TLC Match, thereby earning a WWE Universal Championship match at the Royal Rumble and stripping Corbin of all authoritative power.

On the NXT: Halloween Havoc special on October 28, 2020, Io Shirai retained the NXT Women's Championship against Candice LeRae in a renamed TLC match—a "Tables, Ladders and Scares match"—renamed to fit the social celebration of Halloween. This match used ladders painted black and orange, and tables painted asphalt black with body chalk outlines on them. This was the first time a TLC match was ever done on an NXT show.

Tables, Ladders and Chairs matches

Participant list

Males

Females

Usage in other promotions

Extreme Championship Wrestling 
In other promotions, the TLC match has quite the following, appealing to a niche market within professional wrestling. Predating the TLC matches, two "Tables and Ladders matches" took place. These were traditional matches won by pinfall or submission, not by climbing the ladder for the belts. However, the term "TLC" itself was trademarked by WWE, thus other promotions give different names to these types of matches despite having an identical setup. In more hardcore-style promotions, the chairs were often replaced, or were used alongside, chains. One example of a variation of the TLC match is the Tables, Ladders, Chairs, and Canes match. This match is a TLC match with the addition of Singapore Canes. The first and only TLC match was at Guilty as Charged on January 7, 2001 at the Hammerstein Ballroom in New York, New York, involving Steve Corino, Justin Credible, and The Sandman.

Tables and Ladders/Tables, Ladders, Chairs and Canes matches

Participant list

TNA/Impact Wrestling 
Impact Wrestling - originally Total Nonstop Action Wrestling (TNA) - promotes their own modified version of the TLC match called Full Metal Mayhem.

The inaugural Full Metal Mayhem match featured Jeff Hardy vs. Abyss at Against All Odds 2005. Abyss defeated Hardy by climbing the ladder to retrieve a contract for a shot at the NWA World Heavyweight Championship on a future episode of TNA Impact!.

All totaled there were 12 Full Metal Mayhem matches during the TNA era.

In 2017, TNA changed their name to Impact Wrestling, and under the Impact name five Full Metal Mayhem matches have taken place.

Full Metal Mayhem matches

Participants

Lucha Libre AAA Worldwide

Tables, Ladders and Chairs matches

See also 
 Ladder match
 WWE TLC: Tables, Ladders & Chairs
 Steel cage match

References 

Professional wrestling match types
Impact Wrestling match types
WWE match types